Lea Wait was an American author of historical novels and mysteries, many set in Maine. She has written historical and contemporary books for children aged 7 and up, two books of nonfiction, and the Shadows Antique Print Mystery series and Mainely Needlepoint series for adults.

Biography

Born in Boston, Massachusetts, she grew up in a family where books were an important part of life. Her family summered in Maine. She did her undergraduate work at Chatham College - now Chatham University - in Pittsburgh, Pennsylvania, and her graduate work at New York University, completing all requirements for a doctorate except for the dissertation, a 'DWD', and joining AT&T as a manager. Her grandmother was an antiques dealer, and in 1976 she started an antique print business and decided she should become a writer.  She also, as a single parent, adopted four “older” girls born in Korea, Thailand, Hong Kong, and India.

In 1998, she left corporate life and moved to live in Edgecomb, Maine. She wrote and spoke about writing full-time. She married artist Bob Thomas in October 2003.
Lea Wait passed away in August 2019.

Publications

Antique Print Mysteries
Featuring Maggie Summer, antique dealer and community college professor.

Shadows at the Fair, 2003, nominated for an Agatha Award for Best First Novel.
Shadows on the Coast of Maine, 2003, a Mystery Guild Editor's Selection.
Shadows on the Ivy, 2004.
Shadows at the Spring Show, 2005.
Shadows of a Down East Summer, 2011
Shadows on a Cape Cod Wedding, 2013
Shadows on a Maine Christmas, 2014
Shadows on a Morning in Maine, 2016

Mainely Needlepoint Mysteries

Twisted Treads, 2015
Threads of Evidence, 2015
Thread and Gone, 2016
Dangling by a Thread, 2016
Tightening the Threads, 2017
Thread the Halls, 2017
Thread Herrings, 2018
Thread on Arrival, 2019
Thread and Buried, 2019

Children's Books 
Stopping to Home, 2001, named a Notable Book for Children in 2001 by Smithsonian magazine.
Seaward Born, 2003.
Wintering Well, 2004, named one of "The Best Children's Books of 2004" by The Children's Book Committee at the Bank Street College of Education.
Finest Kind, 2006.
Uncertain Glory, 2014
Pizza to Die For, 2017

Non-fiction 
The Only Writing Series You'll Ever Need: Writing Children's Books with Lesley Bolton, 2007
Living and Writing on the Coast of Maine, 2015

References

American mystery writers
American children's writers
Novelists from Maine
People from Edgecomb, Maine
1946 births
Living people
Chatham University alumni
American women novelists
Women mystery writers
21st-century American women